Georges Mathot (born 26 February 1886, date of death unknown) was a Belgian footballer. He played in two matches for the Belgium national football team in 1908.

References

External links
 

1886 births
Year of death missing
Belgian footballers
Belgium international footballers
Place of birth missing
Association football midfielders